This is an alphabetical list of bus and coach stations in London.

|Wimbledon Bus Station
|Wimbledon, London

See also 
 List of bus garages in London
List of bus stations in Scotland
List of bus stations in Wales

References

London bus and coach stations
Bus and coach stations

Bus stations